Udjus is a surname. Notable people with the surname include:

Ingelise Udjus (1920–2001), Norwegian resistance member, educator, and civil servant
Kenneth Udjus (born 1983), Norwegian footballer
Ragnar Udjus (born 1933), Norwegian media personality and politician

Norwegian-language surnames